SH3 and SYLF domain containing 1 is a protein that in humans is encoded by the SH3YL1 gene.

References

Further reading